Antares was an Italian Eurodance act that became known in the spring of 1995 with the release of their first song entitled "Ride on a Meteorite". The group, also notable by how little information was known at the time about its composition, produced a couple of other hits before disappearing in 1997.

The group was fronted by French models Eric Vincent, Aurore and Sophie. They turned out to only be playback performers, as the real voices behind the project were provided by English rapper Asher Senator and Italian vocalist Clara Moroni.

Discography

Singles

References

External links
 Clara Moroni official site

Italian Eurodance groups
Musical groups disestablished in 1997